Edy Schmidiger (born 30 November 1916, date of death unknown) was a Swiss boxer. He competed in the men's lightweight event at the 1948 Summer Olympics.

References

External links
 

1916 births
Year of death missing
Swiss male boxers
Olympic boxers of Switzerland
Boxers at the 1948 Summer Olympics
Place of birth missing
Lightweight boxers